Stephanie Lana "Stephi" Douglas (born 22 January 1969 in Manchester) is a retired female English athlete who specialised in sprinting events.

Athletics career
She represented Great Britain at the 1992 and 1996 Summer Olympics as well as two outdoor and two indoor World Championships. She represented England and won a silver medal in the 4 x 100 metres relay event, at the 1990 Commonwealth Games in Auckland, New Zealand. Four years later she represented England and won a bronze medal in the 4 x 100 metres relay event, at the 1994 Commonwealth Games in Victoria, British Columbia, Canada.

Competition record

Personal bests
Outdoor
100 metres – 11.27 (+1.6 m/s, Birmingham 1991)
200 metres – 23.17 (Sheffield 1994)
Indoor
60 metres – 7.21 (Glasgow 1995)
200 metres – 23.85 (Fürth 2000)

Personal life
Stephi has one daughter named Jorja who's a member of the girl group FLO. The two appeared on Series 2 of Got What It Takes?, winning the competition and earning a chance to perform on the Main Stage at BBC Radio 1's Big Weekend.

Douglas is also a fan of English football side Manchester City.

References

All-Athletics profile

1969 births
Living people
Sportspeople from Manchester
English female sprinters
Olympic athletes of Great Britain
Athletes (track and field) at the 1992 Summer Olympics
Athletes (track and field) at the 1996 Summer Olympics
Commonwealth Games medallists in athletics
Athletes (track and field) at the 1990 Commonwealth Games
Athletes (track and field) at the 1994 Commonwealth Games
European Athletics Championships medalists
Commonwealth Games silver medallists for England
Commonwealth Games bronze medallists for England
Olympic female sprinters
Medallists at the 1990 Commonwealth Games
Medallists at the 1994 Commonwealth Games